Hajiamir-e Bala is a village in Heyran Rural District, in the Central District of Astara County, Gilan Province, Iran.

References 

Populated places in Astara County